George Palmer (2 August 1903 – 24 August 1986) was an Australian cricketer. He played in nine first-class matches for South Australia between 1924 and 1930.

See also
 List of South Australian representative cricketers

References

External links
 

1903 births
1986 deaths
Australian cricketers
South Australia cricketers
Cricketers from Adelaide